

Geraldine Peak is a  mountain summit located in the Athabasca River valley of Jasper National Park, in the Canadian Rockies of Alberta, Canada. The peak is also known as Whirlpool Mountain, and Mount Geraldine. No name has been officially adopted yet. The names derive from its position at the northern end of the long ridge that divides Geraldine Lakes and Geraldine Creek on the southeast side, from the Whirlpool River on the northwest side. The nearest higher peak is Mount Fryatt,  to the south-southeast. Geraldine Peak can be seen from the Icefields Parkway in the vicinity of Athabasca Falls.

Climate

Based on the Köppen climate classification, Geraldine Peak is located in a subarctic climate with cold, snowy winters, and mild summers. Temperatures can drop below -20 °C with wind chill factors below -30 °C. Precipitation runoff from Geraldine Peak drains into tributaries of the Athabasca River.

Geology

The mountain is composed of sedimentary rock laid down during the Precambrian to Jurassic periods and pushed east and over the top of younger rock during the Laramide orogeny.

Gallery

See also
Geography of Alberta

References

External links
 Parks Canada web site: Jasper National Park
 Climbing Geraldine Peak: Giant's Gate Journeys

Geraldine Peak
Geraldine Peak
Alberta's Rockies
Canadian Rockies